The Osnabrück Canal (formerly the Zweigkanal Osnabrück) or SKO, is an artificial waterway, about  long, that links the Mittelland Canal in central Germany with the port in the town of  Osnabrück.

The 11th Armoured Division crossed the canal during World War II as it advanced across Germany.

Course 
After about 2.5 km it crosses the boundary with the municipality of Wallenhorst where there is a yacht harbour.

The canal now continues in a southeasterly direction into the borough of Osnabrück, where shortly thereafter a side branch, which may only be entered with permission, heads south passing the boathouses of the Osnabrück water sports clubs.

Next the canal enter the port area of Osnabrück in the quarter of Hafen: first the port of Piesberger Hafen, which used to dispatch products from the nearby quarry in the Piesberg, next the oil harbour (Ölhafen) which supplies the city with mineral oils.

It is categorized as a class IV waterway and is the responsibility of the Minden Water and Shipping Office. Here the city port (Stadthafen) begins in which various goods are stored and transshipped. With a length of about 1.5 km the harbour basin is the terminus of the branch canal.

References

External links 
 Osnabrück Canal 

Canals in Lower Saxony

Osnabrück
Canals opened in 1915
Federal waterways in Germany